Mareen Kräh (born 28 January 1984) is a German judoka. She competed at the 2016 Summer Olympics in the women's 52 kg event, in which she was eliminated in the second round by Odette Giuffrida.

References

External links

 
 

1984 births
Living people
German female judoka
European Games silver medalists for Germany
European Games bronze medalists for Germany
European Games medalists in judo
Judoka at the 2015 European Games
Judoka at the 2016 Summer Olympics
Olympic judoka of Germany
20th-century German women
21st-century German women